Rote Rosen (Red Roses) is a German telenovela produced by Studio Hamburg Serienwerft Lüneburg and broadcast by Das Erste since 6 November 2006. The show is a complex telenovela, which tells one love story every season about women in their forties.

Cast

Protagonists couples

Current main characters

Former main actors

See also 
 List of German television series

External links

Notes 

2006 telenovelas
2006 German television series debuts
2010s German television series
German telenovelas
German-language television shows
Das Erste telenovelas